"One Man Band" is a song written by Billy Fox, Tommy Kaye, and January Tyme and performed by Three Dog Night.  It was featured on their 1970 album, Naturally.  The song was produced by Richard Podolor.

In the US, "One Man Band" went to #19 on the Billboard chart in 1971.  Outside the US, "One Man Band peaked at #6 in Canada.

References

External links

1970 songs
1970 singles
Three Dog Night songs
Dunhill Records singles
Songs written by January Tyme
Songs written by Thomas Jefferson Kaye